Beaughton Creek is a stream located in the U.S. state of California. A tributary of the Shasta River, it is located in Siskiyou County.

References

Rivers of Northern California
Rivers of Siskiyou County, California